Hay River  (South Slavey: Xátł’odehchee ), known as "the Hub of the North," is a town in the Northwest Territories, Canada, located on the south shore of Great Slave Lake, at the mouth of the Hay River. The town is separated into two sections, a new town and an old town with the Hay River/Merlyn Carter Airport between them. The town is in the South Slave Region, and along with Fort Smith, the town is home to one of the two regional offices.

History

The area has been in use by First Nations, known as the Long Spear people, as far back as 7000 BC.

According to the Legislative Assembly of the Northwest Territories the first buildings were those of the Hudson's Bay Company in 1868 followed by a Roman Catholic Mission in 1869 and an Anglican Mission in 1894.

However, according to the history of the area provided by the town, the first permanent settlement in the area of Hay River was established in what is now the Katl'odeeche First Nation or Hay River Reserve. This was sometime between 1892 and 1893. This first settlement was established by Chief Chiatlo and a group of people by the building of log cabins and bringing dairy cows. This was followed in 1893 by the Anglican Mission, at the request of Chief Chiatlo in 1893 with the Roman Catholic Mission and the Hudson's Bay Company arriving later.

A school, health centre and the Royal Canadian Mounted Police followed, and as part of the Canol Road project the United States Army Corps of Engineers built a runway on Vale Island in the Hay River delta. In 1948 the Government of Canada built a gravel road, now the Mackenzie Highway, from Grimshaw, Alberta to Hay River, making it the first community in the NWT to be linked with southern Canada. The settlement's role as terminus of all-season trucking, and the establishment of a commercial fishing industry, started an economic boom. In 1949, the community organized its first community government, forming an Administrative District under the direction of the Government of Canada, run by a trustee board with two elected members, two appointed members, and a chairman.

In 1959, the Northern Transportation Company Limited located their main base in Hay River and over the years developed the facilities. Today the base is the major staging point for the annual sealift along the Mackenzie River, via Inuvik and Tuktoyaktuk and the communities of the Arctic Ocean, as far east as Taloyoak, Nunavut and west to Utqiagvik, Alaska.

In 1964, Vale Island, the historical location of the town, was severely flooded. As a response, the town was moved to the new location upstream.

By 1964, as part of the Pine Point Mine development, the Mackenzie Northern Railway was constructed. The railway, through Canadian National Railway in Edmonton, makes Hay River the northernmost point in Canada, and all of North America, which is connected to the continental railway system. The Alaska Railroad is located farther north but is orphaned from the network.

In 1978, Hay River, along with the now-abandoned Pine Point, hosted the fifth Arctic Winter Games.

In 2022, the town suffered flooding caused by ice breakup on the Hay River, resulting in an evacuation order for the entire community. Ice jams built up in two channels, and combined with a wide-ranging storm system, and already waterlogged ground resulted in a larger than normal flood. Hay River also flooded in 1963, 2008, 2009, and 2020.

Services
The community has a full hospital, the H.H. Williams Memorial Hospital, a woman's shelter/transition house, a dental clinic and an ambulance service. The RCMP detachment has eight members and the South Mackenzie Correctional Centre is located here. There are two grocery stores in Hay River, including the Northern Store, branches of both the Canadian Imperial Bank of Commerce and the Royal Bank of Canada and a Home Hardware. There is also a museum detailing the history of Hay River and the Hudson's Bay Company in Old Town.

Airlines servicing Hay River include the locally based Buffalo Airways, who provide scheduled flights to Yellowknife as well as charter services and a courier service throughout the north. First Air provides scheduled services to Yellowknife with connections elsewhere. Northwestern Air also offers scheduled service to Edmonton and Fort Smith. Other companies offering charter services in Hay River include Landa Air, Carter Air Services (fixed-wing aircraft), Denendeh Helicopters and Remote Helicopters.

Religious services include a Catholic church, an Anglican/Grace United church, a Baptist church, a Pentecostal church, and a Community Fellowship within New Town. There is also a Jehovah's Witness Kingdom Hall along the highway coming into town. On the Katl'odeeche First Nations Reserve there are a small Catholic church, and a larger Pentecostal church. There is also an Anglican church that was destroyed in the 2008 Hay River ice breakup. The religious diversity in Hay River exceeds the outward appearance given by these services.

Education

The town hosts four schools, three of which are administered by South Slave Divisional Education Council (SSDEC). The SSDEC is responsible for Harry Camsell K-3 School, Princess Alexandra Middle School, and Diamond Jenness Secondary School, while École Boréale Francophone school is administered separately by the Commission scolaire francophone des Territoires du Nord-Ouest. Harry Camsell is a primary school and serves students from kindergarten to Grade 3. Princess Alexandra, named for and opened by Princess Alexandra in 1967, is a middle school and serves the Grade 4 to the Grade 7. École Boréale is a francophone school that was opened in 2005 and works with students from PK4 to grade 12. Diamond Jenness, named for scientist and anthropologist Diamond Jenness and opened in 1973, is the high school and serves Grade 8 to Grade 12. The town also supports a Community Learning Centre and a Career Centre.

Media

Radio

CKHR-FM 107.3 is a community radio station in Hay River, and the only station in Hay River to maintain local studios; it is owned and operated by the Hay River Community Service Society. Other radio stations in Hay River are repeaters of stations based in Yellowknife.

Television
The Hay River Community Service Society also controls television broadcasting and it is paid for through property taxes, at a rate of $36 per household per year. Channels 2–5, 7, and 8–13 rebroadcast Canadian and US channels in analog format from towers atop the Mackenzie Place highrise. Transmitter powers range from 9W to 2.545 kW. Channels include CIHC-TV channel 5, a community channel; CH4435 channel 8, rebroadcasting Radio-Canada through CBFT Montreal; and CH4160 channel 12, repeating the Aboriginal Peoples Television Network; among other channels. The local CBC-owned CBC North television repeater, CBEBT-1 channel 7, closed on 31 July 2012; however, the Hay River Community Service Society announced that it acquired the transmitter, which they intended to use for CBC Television service.

Print
The Hub is a weekly newspaper published by Northern News Services. The editor is Sarah Ladik. Besides Hay River, the paper is available in Yellowknife, Enterprise, Fort Smith, Inuvik, Fort Providence, Fort Resolution and Grande Prairie.

Communications
Internet services are provided by SSI Micro and NorthwesTel, land based telephone by Northwestel and cell phones by NMI Mobility.

Climate
Hay River has a subarctic climate (Köppen Dfc) with summer lasting for about three months. Although winter temperatures are usually below freezing, every month of the year has seen temperatures above . Rainfall, which can occur throughout the year, averages  and snowfall . From December to January on average there are 71.8 days when the wind chill is below −30, which indicates that frostbite may occur within 10 – 30 minutes.

Demographics

In 2016, the Indigenous population in Hay River is 1,630, up from 1,600 at the 2006 Canadian census, and is made up of First Nations, Métis and Inuit. The main languages in the town are South Slavey, Chipewyan, Michif and English.

Notable people

 Paul Delorey, professional curler and former MLA and speaker in the Northwest Territories Legislature.
 Brendan Green, Canadian team biathlete, participated in the 2010 Winter Olympics in the Men's 4x7.5 km Relay.
 Jane Groenewegen, former member of the Legislative Assembly of the Northwest Territories from Hay River South
 Joe McBryan (Buffalo Joe), president and owner of Buffalo Airways featured on Ice Pilots NWT
 Mikey McBryan, Buffalo Airways General Manager and featured on Ice Pilots NWT
 Rob McVicar, professional ice hockey goaltender
 John Pollard, member of the Legislative Assembly of the Northwest Territories from 1987 until 1995
 Geoff Sanderson, former National Hockey League player
 Donald Morton Stewart, former mayor and speaker of the Northwest Territories Legislature
 Jelena Mrdjenovich, WBA and WBC World female featherweight boxing champion

See also
 List of municipalities in the Northwest Territories
Hay River Water Aerodrome
Hay River (District) Heliport

References

Further reading

 DiLabio, R. N. W. Kimberlitic Indicator Minerals in the Geological Survey of Canada's Archived Till Samples Results of Analysis of Samples from Victoria Island and the Hay River Area, Northwest Territories. [Canada]: Geological Survey of Canada, 1997.

External links

The Town of Hay River

Communities in the South Slave Region
Towns in the Northwest Territories
Hudson's Bay Company trading posts